Nathaniel Wallace may refer to:

 Nathaniel D. Wallace (1845–1894), U.S. Representative from Louisiana
 Nathaniel Clarke Wallace (1844–1901), Canadian politician and Orangeman